Bassam Mohammed Al-Thawadi (born December 13, 1960) is a veteran Bahraini filmmaker and film director, known for producing Bahrain's first feature film, The Barrier, in 1990. Regarded as a regional pioneer in film-making, he is a founding member of the GCC Cinema Society and is also the founder and director-in-general of first Arab Cinema Festival in Bahrain. He had directed numerous short films and also commercials, educational & cultural programmes during his tenure in the Bahrain Radio and Television Corporation as well as performing in plays.

Al-Thawadi was chairman of the Al Sawari Video Festival of 1994 and a member of the judging committee of the Baghdad International Television & Film Festival in 1988. He organized the New Egyptian Cinema Days Festival in Bahrain in 1993, and was the director of the fifth Arab Music Festival in 1996.

Biography
Bassam Mohammed Al Thawadi was born in Gudaibiya in the Bahraini capital, Manama in December 1960. Bassam's father worked in nearby Saudi Arabia in the 1960s, and it was in this time that Bassam developed an interest in photography. In 1979, he studied filming at the Higher Institute of Cinema at the Academy of Arts in Cairo, Egypt and he graduated in 1982. During his study he directed a short drama film, Al Qina'a (translation: The Mask) shot on 16mm and his graduation project was a short drama, Malaekat Al Ardh (translation: Angels of the Earth).

He joined Bahrain TV on May 4, 1985, and had produced a variety programs for the channel. He also produced programmes which were broadcast in all Arab countries which are members of the Arab States Broadcasting Union (ASBU).

In 1990, he produced and directed the feature film The Barrier, widely considered to be the first feature film produced in Bahrain, the film has been entered into several regional and international film festivals, generally winning good reviews. In 2004, he directed and co-produced (the other producer being the Bahrain Cinema Company) the film Visitor, considered to be the second feature film produced in Bahrain and first Dolby sound system in the Persian Gulf. Between those two films he directed many documentary films. In 2006 he directed A Bahraini Tale, the third feature film produced in Bahrain and first DTS sound system in the Persian Gulf region. The movie was critically acclaimed by local and international critics.

He currently works as the head of the drama and documentary section at Bahrain Radio and Television Corporation, at Bahrain's Ministry of Information.

Filmography

 Haneen

Awards
On April 10, 2012, Al-Thawadi was awarded the Lifetime Achievement Award at the 5th Gulf Film Festival in recognition of his lifetime work in Gulf film making.

References

Living people
Bahraini male actors
Bahraini dramatists and playwrights
Bahraini film people
1960 births
21st-century male actors
Bahraini male film actors